A philtrum piercing, nicknamed a medusa piercing, is an upper lip piercing placed in the philtrum, directly under the septum of the nose. It is typically pierced using a labret stud as jewelry, with the ball sitting outside the mouth in the dip of the top lip.

A variation of the philtrum piercing is a jestrum, where the piercing is placed vertically through the lip using curved barbell so both beads are visible. The other variation is called double because it features two pierced spots in a line.

References

External links
Encyclopedia entry on the medusa : Body Modification E-Zine

Facial piercings

de:Labret-Piercing#Medusa-Piercing